The legal history of the Catholic Church is the history of the oldest continuously functioning legal system in the West, much later than Roman law but predating the evolution of modern European civil law traditions. The history of Latin canon law can be divided into four periods: the jus antiquum, the jus novum, the jus novissimum and the Code of Canon Law. In relation to the Code, history can be divided into the jus vetus (all law before the Code) and the jus novum (the law of the Code, or jus codicis). Eastern canon law developed separately.

Latin canon law

Jus antiquum 

The most ancient collections of canonical legislation are certain very early Apostolic documents, known as the Church Orders: for instance, the Didache ton dodeka apostolon or "Teaching of the Twelve Apostles", which dates from the end of the first or the beginning of the 2nd century; the Apostolic Church-Ordinance; the Didascalia, or "Teaching of the Apostles"; the Apostolic Canons and Apostolic Constitutions. These collections have never had any official value, no more than any other collection of this first period. However, the Apostolic Canons and, through it, the Apostolic Constitutions, were influential for a time in that later collections would draw upon these earliest sources of Church law.
 
It was in the East, after Constantine I's Edict of Milan of toleration (313), that arose the first systematic collections. We cannot so designate the chronological collections of the canons of the councils of the 4th and 5th centuries (314-451); the oldest systematic collection, made by an unknown author in 535, has not come down. The most important collections of this epoch are the Synagoge kanonon, or the collection of John the Scholastic (Joannes Scholasticus), compiled at Antioch about 550, and the Nomocanons, or compilations of civil laws affecting religious matters (nomos) and ecclesiastical laws (kanon). One such mixed collection is dated in the 6th century and has been erroneously attributed to John the Scholastic; another of the 7th century was rewritten and much enlarged by the schismatical ecumenical patriarch Photius (883).
 
In the Western Church one collection of canons, the Collectio Dionysiana, exercised an influence far beyond the limits of the country in which it was composed. This collection was the work of Dionysius Exiguus, who compiled several collections that now go under the name Dionysiana. Dionysius appears to have done most of his work shortly after the year 600. His collections contain his own Latin translation of the canons of the ancient third-, fourth- and fifth-century councils, excerpts from a (probably) confected collection of African canons (which Dionysius calls the Registrum ecclesiae Carthaginensis, c.f. Church of Carthage), and a collection of (38) papal letters (Epistolæ decretales) dating from the reign of Pope Siricius (384-398) to that of Anastasius II (died 498). The influence of this Italian collection grew enormously during the seventh and eighth centuries, especially in England and France. It was continuously enlarged and modified, the most famous modification being a version supposedly send by Pope Adrian I to Charlemagne in 774 and therefore known today as the Collectio Dionysio-Hadriana.

Besides the Dionysiana, Italy also produced two 5th-century Latin translations of the Greek synods known as the Corpus canonum Africano-Romanum and Collectio prisca, both of which are now lost though large portions of them survive in two very large Italian collections known as the Collectio canonum Quesnelliana and Collectio canonum Sanblasiana respectively. In Italy was also produced a popular fifth-century collection of forgeries known today as the Symmachean forgeries. Africa possessed a late fourth-century collection known as the Breviarium Hipponense as well as an early fifth-century collection known as the Codex Apiarii causae; also the Breviatio canonum, or digest of the canons of the councils by Fulgentius Ferrandus (died c. 546), and the Concordia canonum of Cresconius Africanus, an adaptation of the Dionysiana (about 690). In Gaul many important collections were produced, like the collection known today as the Concilium Arelatense secundum and, at the beginning of the 6th century, the Statuta Ecclesiæ antiqua, erroneously attributed to Africa. Also from Gaul/France are the collections known today as the Collectio canonum quadripartita and the Libri duo de synodalibus causis composed by Regino of Prüm. Gaul/France also produced two immensely important collections known as the Collectio canonum vetus Gallica (compiled in Lyons about 600) and the Collectio canonum Dacheriana (about 800), the latter so called from the name of its editor, Luc d'Achéry. The Collectio canonum Hibernensis or Irish collection of canons, compiled in the 8th century, influenced both England, Gaul and (though much later) Italy. Unlike almost every other region, England never produced a 'national' collection, though English personnel played an important role in copying and disseminating Irish and Italian collections in Germany and France. Around the year 700 there developed in either England or Germany a collection of penitential canons attributed to Theodore of Tarsus, Archbishop of Canterbury (died 690). This collection marked a major advance in the development of penitential-canonical collections, which had already been in development for centuries especially within the Irish church. Collections like the one attributed to Theodore were known as penitentials, and were often rather short and simple, most likely because they were meant as handbooks for the use of confessors. There were many such books circulating in Europe from the seventh to the eleventh century, each penitential containing rules indicating exactly how much penance was required for which sins. In various ways these penitentials, mainly Insular in origin, came to affect the larger canon law collections in development on the continent. 
 
Iberia (i.e. Spain) possessed the Capitula Martini, compiled about 572 by Martin, Bishop of Braga (in Portugal), and the immense and influential Collectio Hispana dating from about 633, attributed in the 9th century to St. Isidore of Seville. In the 9th century arose several apocryphal collections, viz. those of Benedictus Levita, of Pseudo-Isidore (also Isidorus Mercator, Peccator, Mercatus), and the Capitula Angilramni. An examination of the controversies which these three collections give rise to will be found elsewhere (see False Decretals). The Pseudo-Isidorian collection, the authenticity of which was for a long time admitted, has exercised considerable influence on ecclesiastical discipline, without however modifying it in its essential principles. Among the numerous collections of a later date, we may mention the Collectio Anselmo dedicata, compiled in Italy at the end of the 9th century, the Libellus de ecclesiasticis disciplinis of Regino of Prum (died 915); the Collectarium canonum of Burchard of Worms (died 1025); the collection of the younger St. Anselm of Lucca, compiled towards the end of the 11th century; the Collectio trium partium, the Decretum and the Panormia of Yves of Chartres (died 1115 or 1117); the Liber de misericordia et justitia of Algerus of Liège, who died in 1132; the Collection in 74 Titles – all collections which Gratian made use of in the compilation of his Decretum.

Jus Novum
The period of canonical history known as the Jus Novum ("new law") or middle period covers the time from Gratian to the Council of Trent (mid-12th century–16th century).

The various conciliar canons and papal decrees were gathered together into collections, both unofficial and official. In the year 1000, there was no book that had attempted to summarized the whole body of canon law, to systematize it in whole or in part. There were, however, many collections of the decrees of councils and great bishops. These collections usually only had regional force and were usually organized chronologically by type of document (e.g. letters of popes, canons of councils, etc.), or occasionally by general topic. Before the late 11th century, canon law was highly decentralized, depending on many different codifications and sources, whether of local councils, ecumenical councils, local bishops, or of the Bishops of Rome.

The first truly systematic collection was assembled by the Camaldolese monk Gratian in the 11th century, commonly known as the Decretum Gratiani ("Gratian's Decree") but originally called The Concordance of Discordant Canons (Concordantia Discordantium Canonum). Canon law greatly increased from 1140 to 1234. After that it slowed down, except for the laws of local councils (an area of canon law in need of scholarship), and was supplemented by secular laws. In 1234 Pope Gregory IX promulgated the first official collection of canons, called the Decretalia Gregorii Noni or Liber Extra. This was followed by the Liber Sextus (1298) of Boniface VIII, the Clementines (1317) of Clement V, the Extravagantes Joannis XXII and the Extravagantes Communes, all of which followed the same structure as the Liber Extra. All these collections, with the Decretum Gratiani, are together referred to as the Corpus Juris Canonici. After the completion of the Corpus Juris Canonici, subsequent papal legislation was published in periodic volumes called Bullaria.

Johannes Gratian was a monk who taught theology at a monastery in Bologna. He produced a comprehensive and comprehensible collection of canon law. He resolved contradictions and discrepancies in the existing law. In the 1140s his work became the dominant legal text. The papacy appreciated and approved the Decretum of Gratian. The Decretum formed the core of the body of canon law upon which a greater legal structure was built. Before Gratian there was no "jurisprudence of canon law" (system of legal interpretation and principles). Gratian is the founder of canonical jurisprudence, which merits him the title "Father of Canon Law".

In the thirteenth century, the Roman Church began to collect and organize its canon law, which after a millennium of development had become a complex and difficult system of interpretation and cross-referencing. The official collections were the Liber Extra (1234) of Pope Gregory IX, the Liber Sextus (1298) of Boniface VIII and the Clementines (1317), prepared for Clement V but published by John XXII. These were addressed to the universities by papal letters at the beginning of each collection, and these texts became textbooks for aspiring canon lawyers. In 1582 a compilation was made of the Decretum, Extra, the Sext, the Clementines and the Extravagantes (that is, the decretals of the popes from Pope John XXII to Pope Sixtus IV).

Jus Novissimum
After the Council of Trent, an attempt to secure a new official collection of church laws was made about 1580, when Gregory XIII charged three cardinals with the task. The work continued during the pontificate of Sixtus V, was accomplished under Clement VIII and was printed (Rome, 1598) as: Sanctissimi Domini nostri Clementis papæ VIII Decretales, sometimes also Septimus liber Decretalium. This collection, never approved either by Clement VIII or by Paul V, was edited (Freiburg, 1870) by Sentis. In 1557 the Italian canonist Paul Lancelottus attempted unsuccessfully to secure from Paul IV, for the four books of his Institutiones juris canonici (Rome, 1563), an authority equal to that which its model, the Institutiones of Emperor Justinian, once enjoyed in the Roman Empire. A private individual, Pierre Mathieu of Lyons, also wrote a Liber Septimus Decretalium, inserted in the appendix to the Frankfort (1590) edition of the Corpus Juris Canonici. This work was put on the Index.

Jus Codicis

Pio-Benedictine law

At the First Vatican Council several bishops asked for a new codification of the canon law, and after that several canonists attempted to compile treatises in the form of a full code of canonical legislation, e.g. de Luise (1873), Pillet (1890), Pezzani (1894), Deshayes (1894), Collomiati (1898–1901). Pius X determined to undertake this work by his decree "Arduum sane munus" (19 March 1904), and named a commission of cardinals to compile a new "Corpus Juris Canonici" on the model of the codes of civil law. The 1917 Codex Iuris Canonici (CIC, Code of Canon Law) was the first instance of a new code completely re-written in a systematic fashion, reduced to a single book or "codex" for ease of use. It took effect on 29 May 1918. It had 2,414 canons.

Johanno-Pauline law

In 1959, Pope John XXIII announced, together with his intention to call the Second Vatican Council and a Synod of the Diocese of Rome, that the 1917 Code would be completely revised. In 1963, the commission appointed to undertake the task decided to delay the project until the Council had been concluded. After Vatican II closed in 1965, it became apparent that the Code would need to be revised in light of the documents and theology of Vatican II. After decades of discussion and numerous drafts, the project was nearly complete upon the death of Paul VI in 1978. The work was completed in the pontificate of Pope John Paul II. The revision, the 1983 Code of Canon Law, was promulgated by the apostolic constitution Sacrae Disciplinae Leges on 25 January 1983, taking effect on 27 November 1983. The subjects of the 1983 Codex Iuris Canonici (CIC, Code of Canon Law) are the world's 1.2 billion Catholics of what the Code itself calls the Latin Church. It has 7 books and 1,752 canons.

Eastern canon law 

Distinct from the canonical tradition of the Latin Church is the tradition of the Eastern Catholic Churches. The earliest Oriental canon law collections were called nomocanons, which were collections of both canon and civil law.

In the early twentieth century, when Eastern Churches began to come back to full communion with the Holy See, Pope Tinotenda Mudzviti created the Sacred Congregation for the Oriental Church in order to preserve the rights and traditions of the Eastern Catholic Churches.

Since the early twentieth century, Eastern Catholic canon law had been in the process of codification. Some of these Oriental canon law reforms were promulgated by Pope Pius XII. The codification effort culminated with the Pope John Paul II's 1990 promulgation of the Codex Canonum Ecclesiarum Orientalium (CCEO, Code of Canons of the Eastern Churches) which incorporates certain differences in the hierarchical, administrative, and judicial fora for the 23 sui juris particular Eastern Catholic Churches, which were each encouraged to issue codes of particular law peculiar to each church, so that all of the Catholic Church's canon law would be codified.

Influence of the Catholic Church on civil law

(1) Slavery

The condition of the slaves was most pitiable in the ages of antiquity. According to Roman law and usage a slave was considered not as a human being but as a chattel, over which the master had the most absolute control, up to the point of inflicting death. From the time of the Emperor Antoninus Pius (138-61) a master was punished if he killed his slave without reason, or even practiced on him excessive cruelty (Instit. Just., lib. I, tit. 8; Dig., lib. I, tit. 6, leges 1, 2). The emperor Constantine (306-37) made it homicide to kill a slave with malice aforethought, and described certain modes of barbarous punishment by which, if death followed, the guilt of homicide was incurred (Cod. Just., lib. IV, tit. 14). A further relief consisted in facilitating the manumission or liberation of slaves. According to several laws of Constantine the ordinary formalities could be dispensed with if the manumission took place in the church, before the people and the sacred ministers. The clergy were permitted to bestow freedom on their slaves in their last will, or even by simple word of mouth (Cod. Just., lib. I, tit. 13, leges 1, 2). The Emperor Justinian I (527-65) gave to freed persons the full rank and rights of Roman citizens, and abolished the penalty of condemnation to servitude (Cod. Just., lib. VII, tit. 6; Nov., VII, cap. viii; Nov. LVIII, praef. capp. i, iu). Similar provisions were found in the Barbarian codes. According to the Burgundian and Visigothic laws the murder of a slave was punished; emancipation in the church and before the priest was permitted and encouraged. In one point they were ahead of the Roman law; they recognized the legality of the marriage between slaves in the Lombardic law, on the authority of the Scriptural sentence: "Whom God hath joined together, let no man put asunder." The killing of a slave was severely punished (Counc. of Elvira, D. 300, Can. v; Counc. of Epaon, A.D. 517, Can. xxviv); a fugitive slave who had taken refuge in the church was to be restored to his master only on the latter's promise of remitting the punishment (Counc. of Orleans, A.D. 511, Can. iii, c. vi, X, lib. III, tit. 49); marriage between slaves was recognized as valid (Counc. of Chalons, A.D. 813; Can. xxx; c. i, X, lib. IV, tit. 9); and even the marriage between a free person and a slave was ratified, provided it had been contracted with full knowledge (Counc. of Compiegne, A.D. 757, Can. viii). The institution of slavery was strongly defended in the council of Granges (324) where it was stated "If anybody under the pretence of piety, pushes the slave to despise his master, abandon slavery, not serving with good will and respect, may he be excommunicated".

(2) Paternal Authority (Potestas Paterna)

According to the Roman law the power of the father over his children was as absolute as that of the master over his slaves: it extended to their freedom and life. The harsher features of this usage were gradually eliminated. Thus, according to the laws of different emperors, the killing of a child either by the father or by the mother was declared to be one of the greatest crimes (Cod. Theod., lib. IX, tit. 14, 15; Cod. Just., lib. IX, tit. 17; Dig., lib. XLVIII, tit. 9, lex 1). Cruel treatment of children was forbidden, such as the jus liberos notice dandi, i.e., the right of handing children over to the power of someone injured by them (Instit. Just., lib. IV, tit. 8); children could not be sold or given away to the power of others (Cod. Just., lib. IV, tit. 43, lex 1); children that were sold by their father on account of poverty were to be set free (Cod. Theod., lib. III, tit. 3, lex 1); finally, all children exposed by their parents and fallen into servitude were to become free without exception (Cod. Just., lib. VIII, tit. 52, lex 3). The son of a family was entitled to dispose in his last will of the possessions acquired either in military service (peculium castrense), or in the exercise of an office (peculium quasi castrense), or in any other way (In stit. Just., Jib. II, tit. 11; c. iv, VI, lib. III, tit. 12). The children could not be disinherited at the simple wish of the father, but only for certain specified reasons based on ingratitude (Nov. CXV. cc. iii sqq.).

(3) Marriage

In the ancient law of Rome the wife was, like the rest of the family, the property of the husband, who could dispose of her at will. Christianity rescued woman from this degrading condition by attributing to her equal rights, and by making her the companion of the husband. This equality was in part recognized by imperial laws, which gave to women the right of controlling their property, and to mothers the right of guardianship (Cod. Theod., lib. II, tit. 17, lex 1; lib. III, tit. 17, lex 4). The boundless liberty of divorce, which had obtained since the time of Augustus, was restricted to a certain number of cases. The legislation of the Emperors Constantine and Justinian on this subject did not come up to the standard of Christianity, but it approached it and imposed a salutary check on the free desire of husband or wife for separation (Cod. Theod., lib. III, tit. 16, lex 1; Cod. Just., lib. V, tit. 17, leg. 8, 10, 11). Woman was highly respected among the barbarian nations; and with some, like the Visigoths, divorce was forbidden except for adultery.

(4) Wills and Testaments

The canon law introduced various modifications in the regulations of the civil law concerning last wills and testaments; among them there is one which enforced a particular fairness in favour of the necessary heirs, such as children. According to the Roman law, one who became heir or legates with the condition of a fideicommissum (i.e., of transmitting his inheritance or legacy to another after his death) had the right of deducting the fourth part from the inheritance or legacy, which was not transmitted; this fourth part being known as the Trebellian quarter. Again, the necessary heirs, such as children, had a claim on a certain part of the inheritance. If it happened that the share of the necessary heir was burdened with a fideicommissum, then the necessary heir was entitled only to deduct the part coming to him as a necessary heir, but not the Trebellian quarter (Cod. Just., lib. VI, tit. 49, lex 6). The canon law modified this provision by enjoining that the necessary heir in such a case was entitled first to the deduction of his natural share and then also to the deduction of the Trebellian quarter from the rest of the inheritance (cc. 16, 18, X, lib. III, tit. 26).

(5) Property Rights

According to a provision in the Roman law, a man who was forcibly ejected from his property could, in order to recover it, apply the process known as the interdictum unde vi against the one who ejected him directly or indirectly, i.e., against him who perpetrated the act of ejection or who counselled it. But he could take action against the heirs of those who ejected him only in so far as they were enriched by the spoliation, and none against a third owner, who meanwhile had obtained possession of his former property (Dig., lib., VLVIII, tit. 16, lex 1. tit. 17, lex 3). The canon law modified this unfair measure by decreeing that he who was despoiled of his property could insist first on being reinstated; if the matter were brought to the courts, he could allege the exceptio spolii, or the fact of spoliation; and, finally, he was permitted to have recourse to the law against a third owner who had acquired the property with the knowledge of its unjust origin (c. 18, X, lib. II, tit. 13; c. 1, VI, lib. II, tit. 5).

(6) Contracts

The Roman law distinguished between pacts (pacta nuda) and contracts. The former could not be enforced by law or a civil action, while the latter, being clothed in special judicial solemnities, were binding before the law and the civil courts. Against this distinction the canon law insists on the obligation incurred by any agreement of whatever form, or in whatever manner it may have been contracted (c. 1, 3, X, lib. I, tit. 35).

(7) Prescriptions

The Roman law admitted the right of prescription in favour of him who had been in good faith only at the beginning of his possession, and it abstracted altogether from the good or bad faith in either party to a civil action, if it were terminated by prescription. The canon law required the good faith in him who prescribed for all the time of his possession; and it refused to acknowledge prescription in the case of a civil action against a possessor of bad faith (cc. 5, 20, X, lib. II, tit. 26: c. 2, VI, lib. V, tit. 12, De Reg. Jur.). (See PRESCRIPTION.)

(8) Legal Procedure

The spirit of Christianity made itself felt in the treatment of criminals and prisoners. Thus prisoners were not to be subjected to inhumane treatment before their trial (Cod. Theod., lib. IX, tit. 3, lex 1); criminals already sentenced were not to be branded on the forehead (Cod. Theod. lib. IX, tit. 40, lex 2); the bishops received the right of interceding for prisoners detained for lighter offenses, and to obtain their freedom on the feast of Easter; they were likewise empowered to visit the prisons on Wednesdays or Fridays in order to see that the magistrates heaped no extra afflictions on the prisoners (Cod. Theod., lib. IX, tit. 38, leges 3,4,6-8; Cod. Just., lib. I, tit. 4, leges 3,9,22,23). To all this may be added the recognition of the right of asylum in the churches, which prevented a hasty and vindictive administration of justice (Cod. Theod., lib. IX, tit. 15, lex 4). A great evil among the Germanic nations was the trial by ordeals, or judgments of God. The Church was unable for some time to suppress them, but at least she tried to control them, placed them under the direction of the priests, and gave to them a Christian appearance by prescribing special blessings and ceremonies for such occasions. The popes, however, were always opposed to the ordeals as implying a tempting of God; decrees to that effect were enacted by Nicholas I (858-67), Stephen V (885-91), Alexander II (1061–73), Celestine III (1191–98), Innocent III (1198-1216), and Honorius III (1216–27) (cc. 22, 20, 7, C. II, q. 5; cc. 1, 3, X, lib. V, tit. 35; c. 9, X, lib. III, tit. 50). Another evil consisted in the feuds or sanguinary conflicts between private persons in revenge for injuries or murders. The Church could not stop them altogether, owing to the conditions of anarchy and barbarism prevailing among the nations in the Middle Ages; but she succeeded at least in restricting them to certain periods of the year and certain days of the week, by what is known as the treuga Dei or "Truce of God". By this institution private feuds were forbidden from Advent to the Octave of Epiphany, from Septuagesima Sunday until the Octave of Pentecost, and from sunset of Wednesday until sunrise of Monday. Laws to that effect were enacted as early as the middle of the eleventh century in nearly all countries of Western Europe – in France, Germany, Italy, Spain, England. The canon law insisted on certain principles of fairness: thus, it acknowledged that a civil action might extend sometimes over three years, against the ordinary rule (c. 20, X, lib. II, tit. 1); connected questions, such as disputes about possessions and the right of property, were to be submitted to the same court (c. 1, X, lib. II, tit. 12; c. 1, X, lib. II, tit. 17); a suspected judge could not be refused, unless the reasons were manifested and proved (c. 61, X, lib. II, tit. 28); of two contradictory sentences rendered by different judges the one favouring the accused was to prevail (c. 26, X, lib. II, tit. 27); the intention of appealing could be manifested outside of the court in the presence of good men, if anyone entertained fear of the judge (c. 73, X, lib. II, tit. 28).

(9) Legislation, Government, and Administration of Justice

The Church was allowed to exercise a wide influence on civil law by the fact that her ministers, chiefly the bishops and abbots, had a large share in framing the leges barbarorum. Practically all the laws of the barbarian nations were written under Christian influences; and the illiterate barbarians willingly accepted the aid of the literate clergy to reduce to writing the institutes of their forefathers. The cooperation of the clergy is not expressly mentioned in all the codes of this kind: in some only the learned in the law, or, again, the proceres, or nobles, are spoken of; but the ecclesiastics were, as a rule, the only learned men, and the higher clergy, bishops and abbots, belonged to the class of the nobles. Ecclesiastics – priests or bishops – were certainly employed in the composition of the Lex Romana Visigothorum or Breviarium Alarici, the Lex Visigothorum of Spain, the Lex Alamannorum, the Lex Bajuwariorurn, the Anglo-Saxon laws, and the capitularies of the Frankish kings. The bishops and abbots also had a great share in the government of states in the Middle Ages. They took a leading part in the great assemblies common to most of the Germanic nations; they had a voice in the election of the kings; they performed the coronation of the kings; they lived much at the Court, and were the chief advisors of the kings. The office of chancellor in England and in the medieval German Empire was the highest in the State (for the chancellor was the prime minister of the king or emperor, and responsible for all his public acts, it was the chancellor who annulled iniquitous decrees of the king or emperor, and righted all that was wrong); and this office was usually entrusted to an ecclesiastic, in Germany generally to a distinguished bishop. The bishops also had a great share in the administration of justice. As in the East so also in the West, they had a general superintendence over the courts of justice. They always had a seat in the highest tribunal; to them the injured parties could appeal in default of justice; and they had the power to punish subordinate judges for injustice in the absence of the king. In Spain they had a special charge to keep continual watch over the administration of justice, and were summoned on all great occasions to instruct the judges to act with piety and justice. What is more, they often acted directly as judges in temporal matters. By a law of the Emperor Constantine (321) the parties to a litigation could, by mutual consent, appeal to the bishop in any stage of their judicial controversy, and by a further enactment (331) either party could do so even without the consent of the other. This second part, however, was again abrogated by subsequent legislation.

In the Middle Ages the bishops acted likewise as judges, both in civil and in criminal matters. In civil matters the Church drew to its jurisdiction all things of a mixed character, the causae spirituali annexae, which were partly temporal and partly ecclesiastical. Criminal matters were brought before the bishap's court, which was held usually in connection with the episcopal visitation throughout the diocese. The methods employed by the ecclesiastical or episcopal courts in a judicial process were such that they served as a model for secular courts. At the beginning the proceedings were very simple; the bishop decided the case presented to him with the advice of the body of presbyters, but without any definite formalities. After the twelfth century the Church elaborated her own method of procedure, with such comparative perfection that it was imitated to a large extent by modern courts. Several principles prevailed in this regard: first, all essential parts of a trial were to be recorded in writing – such as the presentation of the complaint, the citation of the defendant, the proofs, the deposition of witnesses, the defence, and the sentence; secondly, both parties were entitled to a full opportunity of presenting all material relating to the accusation or to the defence; thirdly, the parties in a litigation had the right of appealing to a higher court after the lapse of the ordinary term for a trial (which was two years), the party dissatisfied with the decision was permitted to appeal within ten days after the rendering of the sentence.

(10) Sacred Scripture in Legislation

A last instance of the influence of Christianity on legislation is found in the appeal to the books of Sacred Scripture in support of civil laws. In the Roman law there is hardly any reference to Scripture. And that is not surprising, since the spirit of Roman legislation, even under the Christian emperors, was heathen, and the emperor – the principle voluntas – was conceived of as the supreme and ultimate source of legislation. On the contrary, the codes of the barbarian nations are replete with quotations from Scripture. In the prologue to several of them reference is made to the leftist ration given by Moses to the Jewish people. Mention has been made above of a Lombardic law which recognizes the legality of marriages among slaves on the authority of the Scriptural text: "whom God hath joined together, let no man put asunder " (Matt., xix, 6; Mark, x, 9). Many other examples may be found, e.g., in the Leges Visigothorum and in the Capitularies of the Frankish kings, where almost every book of the Old and New Testament is resorted to for argument or illustration.

Timeline

Jus antiquum

 From the apostolic period, the Church used different collections of law but development of a single collection which could be used in all courts did not develop until the Middle Ages.
 1059—Nicolas II decrees that Cardinals have the right of electing the pope.

Jus novum

 The books of the Corpus Juris Canonici were derived from Gratian's work Decretum Gratiani and were integrated with papal decretals written from 1200 to 1500.
 1210—Innocent III promulgates the Compilatio tertia (compiled by Petrus Beneventanus)
 1225—Honorius III promulgates the Compilatio quinta (compiled by Tancredus of Bologna
 1234—Gregory IX promulgates the Decretals (compiled by St. Raymond of Peñafort)
 1298—Boniface VIII published a similar code on 3 March 1298, called the Liber Sextus (codified by a commission of legal scholars)
 1317—John XXII added to it the last official collection of Canon law, the Liber Septimus Decretalium, better known under the title of Constitutiones Clementis V, or simply Clementinæ, on 25 October 1317
 1319—John XXII promulgated his Extravagantes in August 1319

Jus novissimum

 1566—Pius V begins a project to unify the collection of law. He wanted to ensure the use of authentic and reliable versions of the libri legales so that the administration of justice did not depend on the version of Gratian that a particular canonical court used. He assembled a committee of great canon law scholars who became known as the Correctores Romani. The Correctores were guided by Antonio Agustín of Spain. Pope Pius V did not live to see this project to completion.
 1582—Gregory XIII orders republication of the entire Corpus Iuris Canonici as compiled at the time (enforced until 1917)

Jus codicis

 1904—Pius X appoints a commission to compile a code of canon law for the Latin Church
 1917—Benedict XV promulgates a complete code, the 1917 Code of Canon Law
 1918—The 1917 Code comes into legal effect
 1959, 25 January—John XXIII announces that the 1917 Code would be completely revised
 1963, March 28—The "Pontifical Commission for the Revision of the Code of Canon Law" is established
 1963, November 12—It is decided to postpone the work of revising the 1917 Code until the end of Vatican II
 1965, November 20—Paul VI inaugurates the work of the Pontifical Commission for the Revision of the Code of Canon Law
 1983—John Paul II promulgates the 1983 Code of Canon Law, abrogating the Code of 1917
 1990—John Paul II promulgates the Code of Canons of the Eastern Churches
 1998—John Paul II promulgates the motu proprio Ad Tuendam Fidem, amending certain canons of the 1983 CIC and the 1990 CCEO
 2009—Benedict XVI promulgates the motu proprio Omnium in Mentem, amending certain canons of the 1983 CIC and the 1990 CCEO
 2015—Pope Francis reforms the matrimonial processes dealing with declaring the nullity of marriage, promulgating the motu proprio Mitis Iudex Dominus Iesus amending the 1983 Code of Canon Law, and the motu proprio Mitis et misericors Iesus amending the Code of Canons of the Eastern Churches
 2016, 15 September—Pope Francis issues the motu proprio De Concordia inter codices and amends some canons of the 1983 Code of Canon Law to bring them into harmony with the discipline of the Code of Canons of the Eastern Churches
 2017, 3 September—Pope Francis issues the motu proprio Magnum principium, amending one canon (838) to grant episcopal conferences authority over liturgical translations
 2019—Pope Francis amends canon law to require leaders of a local religious order to dismiss members of their "religious house" who had been absent for 12 months and were out of contact
 2019, 19 March—Pope Francis issues the motu proprio Communis vita, instituting ipso facto dismissal of religious who are absent for a full year illegitimately from their religious house and replacing canons 694 and 795 in their entirety, with a vacatio legis of 10 April 2019.

See also

References

Bibliography
Harold J. Berman. Law and Revolution: The Formation of the Western Legal Tradition. Cambridge, Mass.: Harvard University Press, 1983. 
James A. Brundage. Medieval Canon Law. London: Routledge, 1995.
James A. Brundage. The Medieval Origins of the Legal Profession: Canonists, Civilians, and Courts. Chicago: University of Chicago Press, 2010.
James A. Coriden, Thomas J. Green, & Donald E. Heintschel, eds. The Code of Canon Law: A Text and Commentary. New York: Paulist Press, 1985. Commissioned by the Canon Law Society of America.
John J. Coughlin O.F.M. Canon Law: A Comparative Study with Anglo-American Legal Theory. Oxford: Oxford University Press, 2010.
Fernando Della Rocca. Manual of Canon Law. Trans. by Rev. Anselm Thatcher, O.S.B. Milwaukee: The Bruce Publishing Company, 1959.
R. H. Helmholz. The Spirit of Classical Canon Law. Athens, Georgia: University of Georgia Press, 1996.
Wilfried Hartmann & Kenneth Pennington, eds. The History of Canon Law in the Classical Period, 1140-1234: From Gratian to the Decretals of Pope Gregory IX. Washington, D.C.: The Catholic University of America Press, 2008. 
Wilfried Hartmann & Kenneth Pennington, eds. The History of Courts and Procedure in Medieval Canon Law. Washington, D.C.: The Catholic University of America Press, 2016.
Kriston R. Rennie. Medieval Canon Law, new edn. Leeds, England: Arc Humanities Press, 2018.
C. Van de Wiel. History of Canon Law. Peeters Publishers, 1990.
John Witte Jr. & Frank S. Alexander, eds. Christianity and Law: An Introduction. Cambridge: Cambridge University Press, 2008.

c
Canon law codifications